The 2010 FIBA World Championship for Women, the 16th edition of FIBA's premier tournament for women's national basketball teams, was held from September 23 to October 3, 2010 in the Czech Republic. Three cities, Ostrava, Brno and Karlovy Vary, hosted games. Four countries initially bid for the event but Australia, France and Latvia withdrew during the bidding process.

The USA won its eighth title, extending its own record for the most wins in tournament history. The other medalists—the Czech Republic with silver and Spain with bronze—had not previously medaled at a World Championship. The Czechoslovakia women's team had won six medals in previous World Championships, but FIBA considers the Czech Republic and Slovakia to be separate teams from the former Czechoslovakia. The Czech Republic's Hana Horáková was chosen as the tournament's most valuable player.

Pre-tournament favourites USA, Russia, and Australia dominated play in the first two rounds, with the Russia and the USA going undefeated and Australia only losing to the USA in the second round after both teams had guaranteed progression to the quarterfinals.  In the quarterfinals, however, Russia and Australia suffered shock defeats to Belarus and the Czech Republic respectively.  Meanwhile, the USA cruised into the final with easy wins over injury-ridden South Korea and Spain. After knocking out the defending World Champions, the Czechs defeated Belarus in overtime to set up the final with the USA.

In the final the USA were heavy favourites but the Czechs were supported by a partisan crowd of over 6000 that included Czech president Václav Klaus. The USA led for most of the match, but the Czechs were able to keep it close in the first half, trailing only 40-35 at the break. The USA pulled away in the second half to win 89-69.

Venues

The tournament was held in three cities. The Preliminary Round and the Eighth-final Round was played at Brno and Ostrava, while the Final Round was played at Karlovy Vary.

Qualification
16 teams participated in the 2010 World Championship for Women. After the 2008 Summer Olympics, the continental allocation for FIBA Americas was reduced by one when the United States won the Olympic tournament, they automatically qualified for the 2010 World Championship.

Squads

Preliminary round 

Times given below are in CEST (UTC+2).

Group A

Group B

Group C

Group D

Eighth-final round

Group E

Group F

Knockout round

Championship Bracket

13th–16th playoffs

13th–16th semifinals

15th place playoff

13th place playoff

9th–12th playoffs

9th–12th semifinals

11th place playoff

9th place playoff

5th–8th playoffs

5th–8th semifinals

7th place playoff

5th place playoff

Quarterfinals

Semifinals

Bronze medal game

Final

Statistical leaders

Points

Rebounds

Assists

Blocks

Steals

Final standings

Awards

All-Tournament Team 
 Hana Horáková
 Diana Taurasi
 Eva Vítečková
 Sancho Lyttle
 Yelena Leuchanka

See also
 2010 FIBA World Championship for Men
 2010 Wheelchair Basketball World Championship

References

External links

2010 FIBA World Championship for Women official website

 
2010
2010 in women's basketball
International women's basketball competitions hosted by the Czech Republic
2010 in Czech women's sport
September 2010 sports events in Europe
October 2010 sports events in Europe
2010–11 in Czech basketball